The Mystic Braves are an American psychedelic rock band, formed by Julian Ducatenzeiler and Tony Malacara in 2011 and based in Los Angeles. The band cites the Seeds, the Zombies, the Beatles, Ultimate Spinach, along with garage rock and surf rock as influences.

History 
Mystic Braves was founded in 2011 under the name Blackfeet Braves by friends Julian Ducatenzeiler, Dan Solis and Tony Malacara when they started going to shows together in the Los Angeles area. The three later met Shane Stotsenberg and Cameron Gartung after a show in Venice.  The band put its debut self-titled record out in 2013 and continued gaining popularity in the Southern California music scene, which led to Mystic Braves opening for the English rock band the Zombies. Organ player and co-founder of Lolipop Records eventually joined the band and they started to gain momentum in Los Angeles and abroad, especially in the garage rock and psychedelic revival scenes. 

In 2014, the band issued their sophomore album, Desert Island, which was released on Lolipop Records. Blackfeet Braves were then sued by Lynyrd Skynyrd's former drummer, Rickey Medlocke, who has a band called Blackfoot, leading them to rebrand themselves as the Mystic Rabbits, after one of their earlier songs, to eventually settling on a mix of the two names, Mystic Braves. The band enjoyed international success with the release of Desert Island, and toured the US and Europe several times over the next two years. 

In 2015, the band's third release Days of Yesteryear was produced by Rob Campanella in his Echo Park studio.  

In 2018, the band released The Great Unknown, produced by Kyle Mullarky at his studio in Topanga Canyon, California and at Lolipop Records' new studio/compound in East Los Angeles. 

In 2022, their fifth album, Pacific Afterglow, was released.

Discography

Albums

Singles and EPs

Compilation albums

Members

Current
Julian Ducantenzeiler – lead vocals, guitar, (2011–present)
Shane Stotsenburg – guitar, backing vocals (2011–present)
Ignacio Gonzales – bass, organ, guitar, vocals, tambourine (2013–present)

Former
Cameron Gartung – drums, percussion, electronics (2012–2020)
Tony Malacara – vocalist/bassist (2011–2019; Injured)
Dan Solis – drums (2011–2012)

Timeline

References

Musical groups established in 2011
Psychedelic rock music groups from California
Musical groups from Los Angeles
2011 establishments in California